Malcolm Barbour is an American former television producer and the co-creator and former executive producer of the television program Cops (alongside John Langley). Prior to Cops, Barbour worked with Langley on Who Murdered JFK, Cocaine Blues and American Vice: The Doping of a Nation. He stopped being a producer in 1994.

In 2003, a Golden Palm Star on the Palm Springs, California, Walk of Stars was dedicated to him.

References

External links
 

Year of birth missing (living people)
Living people
American television producers
Place of birth missing (living people)